Indole-3-carboxylate decarboxylase is an enzyme with systematic name indole-3-carboxylate carboxy-lyase. This enzyme catalyses the following chemical reaction

 indole-3-carboxylate  indole + CO2

This enzyme is activated by Zn2+, Mn2+ or Mg2+.

References

External links 
 

EC 4.1.1